Alexander Slatnow (September 29, 1950 – May 21, 2003) was an East German sprint canoeist who competed in the early to mid-1970s. He won two gold medals in the K-2 1000 m event at the ICF Canoe Sprint World Championships, earning them in 1971 and 1975.

Slatnow also finished fourth in the K-2 1000 m event at the 1972 Summer Olympics in Munich.

References

1950 births
2003 deaths
Canoeists at the 1972 Summer Olympics
German male canoeists
Olympic canoeists of East Germany
ICF Canoe Sprint World Championships medalists in kayak